Ariel Francisco Rodríguez Araya (born September 27, 1989 in San José) is a Costa Rican professional footballer who plays as a forward for Liga FPD club Saprissa and the Costa Rica national team.

Career

Club

Deportivo Saprissa
He finished 2015–16 in Costa Rica as league top scorer, with 20.

Bangkok Glass
On January 6, 2016, Rodríguez completed a move to Bangkok Glass on a two years contract. Ariel Rodriguez made the official debut for Bangkok Glass in the first match of 2016 Thai League against Osotspa March 6, 2016. He scored 2 goals in his debut.

International
He debuted and scored his first international goal for Costa Rica against Venezuela.

Ariel was recalled again for the Copa América Centenario squad but then pulled out due to injury and was replaced by Johnny Woodly.

International goals
As of match played 14 July 2017. Costa Rica score listed first, score column indicates score after each Rodríguez goal.

Personal life
He is the son of the former Costa Rica footballer, currently a camera operator for Teletica and 1993 CONCACAF Gold Cup third-place Erick Rodríguez.

Honours
Saprissa
 Liga FPD: Clausura 2014, Apertura 2014, Apertura 2015, Clausura 2018, Clausura 2020, Clausura 2021
 Costa Rican Cup: 2013

Individual
 Costa Rican Cup Top Goal Scorers: 2014
 Costa Rican Primera División Top Goal Scorers : 2015–16

References

External links
 
 BGFC player profile
 

1989 births
Living people
Costa Rican footballers
Costa Rica international footballers
People from San José, Costa Rica
Santos de Guápiles footballers
Puntarenas F.C. players
Belén F.C. players
Deportivo Saprissa players
Ariel Rodriguez
Ariel Rodriguez
Costa Rican expatriate footballers
Costa Rican expatriate sportspeople in Thailand
Expatriate footballers in Thailand
Association football forwards
2017 CONCACAF Gold Cup players